This is a list of winners and nominees for the BAFTA Award for Best Makeup and Hair, which is presented to make-up artists and hairstylists, given out by the British Academy of Film and Television Arts since 1983.

Winners and nominees

1980s
Best Make-Up Artist

1990s

Best Make-Up

Best Make-Up and Hair

2000s

2010s

Best Make Up & Hair

2020s

See also
 Saturn Award for Best Make-up
 Critics' Choice Movie Award for Best Makeup
 Academy Award for Best Makeup and Hairstyling
 Make-Up Artists and Hair Stylists Guild Award for Best Contemporary Make-Up in a Feature-Length Motion Picture
 Make-Up Artists and Hair Stylists Guild Award for Best Special Make-Up Effects in a Feature-Length Motion Picture
 Make-Up Artists and Hair Stylists Guild Award for Best Contemporary Hair Styling in a Feature-Length Motion Picture
 Make-Up Artists and Hair Stylists Guild Award for Best Period and/or Character Make-Up in a Feature-Length Motion Picture
 Make-Up Artists and Hair Stylists Guild Award for Best Period and/or Character Hair Styling in a Feature-Length Motion Picture

References

External links
 

British Academy Film Awards
 
Film awards for makeup and hairstyling